Guy Camil Chouinard (born October 20, 1956) is a Canadian former professional ice hockey player who played in the 1970s and 80's for the Atlanta Flames, Calgary Flames, and St. Louis Blues. He has also had a lengthy career as a coach in the QMJHL since retiring as a player. He is now head coach in Quebec's college hockey league with the Champlain-St. Lawrence Lions in Quebec City.

Playing career
As a youth, Chouinard played in four consecutive Quebec International Pee-Wee Hockey Tournaments from 1966 to 1969, with the Quebec Citdelle and Quebec Beavers minor ice hockey teams from Quebec City.

Chouinard was selected by the Atlanta Flames with the 28th overall pick in the 1974 NHL Entry Draft, following a successful junior career with the Quebec Remparts in which he was a regular at the age of 15. He was one of the first underage players available in the entry draft after the National Hockey League's decision  allowing the drafting of underage players. While playing with Atlanta, he set records for scoring goals in six consecutive games from November 14 to November 24, 1978; he was the first Flame to score 50 goals in a season in the 1978–79 season. Chouinard scored the final goal in Atlanta Flames history during the 1979-80 NHL playoffs in a 5-2 home team loss against the New York Rangers. He remained with the team when it relocated to Calgary for the 1980–81 season. He left the Flames franchise as its all-time leader in points (529) and assists (336) (records since broken) on September 6, 1983, when he was traded to the St. Louis Blues for future considerations.

After playing in the first nine games of the 1984-85 season in the International Hockey League with Peoria, Chouinard opted to retire.

Coaching career
Chouinard has also had a brilliant career (more than 10 years) coaching in the Quebec Major Junior Hockey League, notably for the Victoriaville Tigres, Quebec Remparts, and Prince Edward Island Rocket and was enshrined in the QMJHL Hall of Fame in 2005. He has coached the second most games in the QMJHL (988), most wins as a coach (515) and most championships as a coach (4).

From 2002 to 2006, he coached in the Ligue Nord-Américaine de Hockey, a minor professional league in Quebec, first with the Trois-Rivieres Vikings, then the Thetford-Mines Prolab. He was fired as the Prolab head-coach on January 13, 2006, after a 7–3 loss against the Saint-Hyacinthe Cristal. With the Prolab, his record was 45 wins and 48 loss (including 10 shootout loss and 2 losses in overtime).

Chouinard was hired by the QMJHL's Prince Edward Island Rocket to replace Yanick Jean as head coach, on October 22, 2007. He was relieved of his duties on October 6, 2009.

Other
Chouinard was nicknamed "Gramps" because he appeared much older than he really was. He is not the only member of his family to play professional hockey; he is the older brother of former minor-leaguer Jean Chouinard and the father of Eric Chouinard, who currently is in the Grenoble Bruleurs de loups organization. His nephew, Marc Chouinard, played in the NHL for the Mighty Ducks of Anaheim, Minnesota Wild and Vancouver Canucks.

Career statistics

See also
 Notable families in the NHL
 List of NHL players with 100-point seasons

References

External links

1956 births
Living people
Atlanta Flames draft picks
Atlanta Flames players
Calgary Flames players
Canadian ice hockey centres
French Quebecers
Ice hockey people from Quebec City
Laval Titan coaches
Longueuil Chevaliers coaches
Nova Scotia Voyageurs players
Omaha Knights (CHL) players
P.E.I. Rocket coaches
Peoria Rivermen (IHL) players
Quebec Remparts coaches
Quebec Remparts players
St. Louis Blues players
Victoriaville Tigres coaches
Canadian ice hockey coaches